Sarah Douglas (born 21 January 1994 Burlington) is a Canadian competitive sailor. She is the reigning women's Pan American champion in the laser radial event when she won gold in 2019 in Lima, Peru. 

She finished 6th at the 2018 Sailing World Championships. She competed at the 2020 Summer Olympics in Japan, finishing 6th in the Laser Radial class.

Life 
She was born in Burlington, Ontario. She started sailing at the age of 7 in Barbados and competed at her first world championship at age 10 in the optimist class. She was Optimist Canadian national champion. 

Douglas went to school at the University of Guelph for her Bachelor of Commerce; as of 2019, she lists Toronto as her hometown.

References

External links

1991 births
Living people
Canadian female sailors (sport)
Sportspeople from Burlington, Ontario
Sailors at the 2010 Summer Youth Olympics
Pan American Games medalists in sailing
Pan American Games gold medalists for Canada
Sailors at the 2019 Pan American Games
Medalists at the 2019 Pan American Games
Sailors at the 2020 Summer Olympics – Laser Radial